An isolated population of the Rhodesian girdled lizard (Cordylus rhodesianus) from granite outcrops in montane grassland of northern Malawi was recently redescribed as Cordylus nyikae.  Unlike the Rhodesian girdled lizard, the head shields of this species are very rugose, the nostrils are pierced in the lower posterior corner of the nasal scales, and the dorsals do not have a serrated posterior margin.  The dorsal coloration is dark brown to gray-brown with lighter spots.  The tail and upper lips are light brown.  The belly is buff. Its common name is Nyika girdled lizard.

References 

Branch, B. (1998). Field Guide to Snakes and other Reptiles of Southern. Africa: Ralph Curtis Books Publishing, Sanibel Island, Florida, 399 p.

Broadley, D. G. and Branch, W. R. (2002). A review of the small east African Cordylus (Sauria: Cordylidae), with the description of a new species. African Journal of Herpetology 51(1): 9–34.

Broadley, D. G. and Mouton, P. F. N. (2000). A new species of rupicolous Cordylus laurenti from Malawi (Sauria: Cordylidae). African Journal of Herpetology 49(2): 169–172.

External links
 Cordylus nyikae, The Reptile Database

Cordylus
Reptiles of Malawi
Reptiles described in 2000
Taxa named by Donald George Broadley
Taxa named by Pieter Le Fras Nortier Mouton
Southern Rift montane forest–grassland mosaic